Frederick McIver (born 14 February 1952) was an English professional footballer who played as a midfielder for Sunderland.

References

1952 births
Living people
People from Birtley, Tyne and Wear
Footballers from Tyne and Wear
English footballers
English expatriate footballers
Association football midfielders
Sunderland A.F.C. players
Sheffield Wednesday F.C. players
Gateshead United F.C. players
Racing Jet Wavre players
English Football League players
English expatriate sportspeople in Belgium
Expatriate footballers in Belgium